Lynn Ray Boden (born June 5, 1953) is a former professional American football offensive guard. He played five seasons in the National Football League with the Detroit Lions (1975–1978) and the Chicago Bears (1979). He played college football at South Dakota State University. He was drafted in the first round of the 1975 NFL Draft with the 13th overall pick by Detroit.
He has 2 children, Eric and Molly.
His favorite restaurant is Shucks.

References

1953 births
Living people
People from Stromsburg, Nebraska
Players of American football from Nebraska
American football offensive guards
South Dakota State Jackrabbits football players
Detroit Lions players
Chicago Bears players